One on One may refer to:

Film and television 
 Mansbridge One on One, weekly TV program on CBC Television
 One on One (1977 film), a 1977 movie starring Robby Benson and Annette O'Toole
 One on One (soundtrack), the soundtrack album from the film
 One on One (2014 film), a 2014 South Korean film
 One on One (TV series), a 2000s American sitcom
 One on One with John Tesh, a 1991-92 American daytime talk show hosted by John Tesh
 One on One with Steve Adubato, an American television talk show
 Riz Khan One on One, a former programme on Al Jazeera English

Music

Albums
 One on One, by Shelly Manne and Russ Freeman, Atlas 1982
 One on One (Bob James and Earl Klugh album)
 One on One (Cheap Trick album)
 One on One (Mira Calix album)
 One on One (Randy Owen album)
 One on One (Stéphane Grappelli and McCoy Tyner album)
 One on One (Steve Camp album)
 One on One (Yazz album)
 One on One (One Songwriter, One Instrument), a Spiritone Records compilation album including a song by Ralston Bowles
 1 on 1 (Rupee album), Rupee album 2004

Songs
 "One on One" (song), a song by Hall & Oates

Concert
 One on One (tour), a 2016-2017 concert world tour by Paul McCartney

Other media 
 One on One (novel), a novel by Tabitha King
 One on One, an interview series on the SourceFed YouTube channel
 One on One: Dr. J vs. Larry Bird, a computer game
 Jordan vs. Bird: One on One, a computer game and sequel to "One on One: Dr. J vs. Larry Bird"
 One on One, a game for PlayStation
 One on One with Igan, a Filipino radio show

See also 
 One on one tackle, a play in rugby league football
 One-to-one (disambiguation)
 Personal (disambiguation) 
 Professional wrestling match types#Variations of singles matches, often referred to as a one on one match in professional wrestling